This is a list of rivers in Mauritania. This list is arranged  by drainage basin, with respective tributaries indented under each larger stream's name.

Atlantic Ocean
Khatt Atui
Oued Seguellil
Sénégal River
Gorgol River
Gorgol Noir (Gorgol el Akhdar)
Gorgol Blanc (Gorgol el Abiod)
Oued Garfa
Karakoro River
Kolinbiné River

References
Rand McNally, The New International Atlas, 1993.
 GEOnet Names Server

Mauritania
Rivers